The 1941 Philadelphia Phillies season was a season in Major League Baseball. The Phillies finished eighth in the National League with a record of 43 wins and 111 losses.

On July 1, the Phillies played the Dodgers in Brooklyn; the game was televised by WNBT in New York (now WNBC), making the ballgame the first program aired by a commercial TV station in the United States. Although the Phillies finished dead last and the Dodgers later won the pennant, Philadelphia won the game 6–4, in 10 innings.

Regular season

Season standings

Record vs. opponents

Game log 

|- style="background:#bfb"
| 1 || April 15 || Braves || 6–5 || Cy Blanton (1–0) || Dick Errickson (0–1) || None || 10,595 || 1–0
|- style="background:#fbb"
| 2 || April 16 || Braves || 1–4 || Manny Salvo (1–0) || Ike Pearson (0–1) || None || 3,516 || 1–1
|- style="background:#fbb"
| 3 || April 17 || Braves || 5–7 || Wes Ferrell (1–0) || Boom-Boom Beck (0–1) || None || not available || 1–2
|- style="background:#fbb"
| 4 || April 18 || @ Giants || 2–7 || Bob Bowman (1–0) || Vito Tamulis (0–1) || None || 13,980 || 1–3
|- style="background:#fbb"
| 5 || April 19 || @ Giants || 0–7 || Hal Schumacher (1–0) || Tommy Hughes (0–1) || None || 14,192 || 1–4
|- style="background:#fbb"
| 6 || April 20 || @ Braves || 5–7 (10) || Hank LaManna (1–0) || Boom-Boom Beck (0–2) || None || 11,824 || 1–5
|- style="background:#fbb"
| 7 || April 21 || @ Braves || 1–8 || Wes Ferrell (2–0) || Ike Pearson (0–2) || None || 1,687 || 1–6
|- style="background:#bfb"
| 8 || April 22 || @ Braves || 6–4 (14) || Tommy Hughes (1–1) || Jim Tobin (0–2) || None || 1,317 || 2–6
|- style="background:#fbb"
| 9 || April 23 || @ Dodgers || 0–4 || Whit Wyatt (2–1) || Ike Pearson (0–3) || None || 4,146 || 2–7
|- style="background:#fbb"
| 10 || April 24 || @ Dodgers || 1–6 || Luke Hamlin (2–1) || Roy Bruner (0–1) || None || 2,518 || 2–8
|- style="background:#fbb"
| 11 || April 25 || Giants || 4–7 || Hal Schumacher (2–0) || Cy Blanton (1–1) || Jumbo Brown (2) || 1,000 || 2–9
|- style="background:#bfb"
| 12 || April 26 || Giants || 7–6 (11) || Johnny Podgajny (1–0) || Cliff Melton (0–2) || None || 2,265 || 3–9
|- style="background:#fbb"
| 13 || April 27 || Braves || 3–8 || Bill Posedel (1–0) || Tommy Hughes (1–2) || None || 4,225 || 3–10
|- style="background:#bfb"
| 14 || April 29 || Pirates || 6–2 || Bill Crouch (1–0) || Max Butcher (1–2) || None || 800 || 4–10
|- style="background:#bfb"
| 15 || April 30 || Pirates || 8–4 || Cy Blanton (2–1) || Dick Lanahan (0–1) || None || 3,385 || 5–10
|-

|- style="background:#fbb"
| 16 || May 1 || Pirates || 2–15 || Russ Bauers (1–2) || Si Johnson (0–1) || None || 1,500 || 5–11
|- style="background:#fbb"
| 17 || May 2 || Cardinals || 2–4 || Howie Krist (1–0) || Johnny Podgajny (1–1) || None || 1,000 || 5–12
|- style="background:#fbb"
| 18 || May 3 || Cardinals || 0–6 || Hank Gornicki (1–0) || Bill Crouch (1–1) || None || 2,404 || 5–13
|- style="background:#bfb"
| 19 || May 4 || Reds || 3–0 || Tommy Hughes (2–2) || Gene Thompson (0–2) || None || 6,471 || 6–13
|- style="background:#bbb"
| – || May 5 || Reds || colspan=6 | Postponed (threatening weather and rain); Makeup: June 5
|- style="background:#bfb"
| 20 || May 6 || Reds || 4–2 || Cy Blanton (3–1) ||  || None || 1,797 || 7–13
|- style="background:#fbb"
| 21 || May 7 || Cubs || 2–11 || Bill Lee (1–3) || Bill Crouch (1–2) || None || 3,514 || 7–14
|- style="background:#fbb"
| 22 || May 8 || Cubs || 1–5 || Vern Olsen (1–1) || Ike Pearson (0–4) || None || 1,223 || 7–15
|- style="background:#bbb"
| – || May 9 || Dodgers || colspan=6 | Postponed (rain); Makeup: September 20 as a traditional double-header
|- style="background:#fbb"
| 23 || May 10 || Dodgers || 1–4 || Whit Wyatt (6–1) || Tommy Hughes (2–3) || None || 3,344 || 7–16
|- style="background:#fbb"
| 24 || May 11 || Dodgers || 5–6 || Kirby Higbe (3–2) || Bill Crouch (1–3) || None || 10,305 || 7–17
|- style="background:#fbb"
| 25 || May 13 || @ Pirates || 3–6 || Rip Sewell (2–2) || Lee Grissom (0–1) || None || 986 || 7–18
|- style="background:#fbb"
| 26 || May 14 || @ Pirates || 7–12 || Bob Klinger (1–1) || Roy Bruner (0–2) || None || 1,254 || 7–19
|- style="background:#bfb"
| 27 || May 15 || @ Reds || 5–4 || Bill Crouch (2–3) || Gene Thompson (0–3) || Ike Pearson (1) || 18,814 || 8–19
|- style="background:#bfb"
| 28 || May 17 || @ Reds || 2–1 || Johnny Podgajny (2–1) || Bucky Walters (4–3) || None || 3,107 || 9–19
|- style="background:#fbb"
| 29 || May 18 || @ Cardinals || 5–6 || Howie Krist (2–0) || Lee Grissom (0–2) || None || 9,833 || 9–20
|- style="background:#bfb"
| 30 || May 20 || @ Cardinals || 6–4 (11) || Ike Pearson (1–4) || Ira Hutchinson (0–2) || None || 1,084 || 10–20
|- style="background:#fbb"
| 31 || May 21 || @ Cubs || 3–7 || Jake Mooty (2–0) || Lefty Hoerst (0–1) || None || 3,411 || 10–21
|- style="background:#bbb"
| – || May 22 || @ Cubs || colspan=6 | Postponed (rain); Makeup: June 15 as a traditional double-header
|- style="background:#fbb"
| 32 || May 24 || @ Dodgers || 3–7 || Kirby Higbe (4–3) || Tommy Hughes (2–4) || Bill Swift (1) || 8,576 || 10–22
|- style="background:#fbb"
| 33 || May 25 || @ Dodgers || 4–8 || Bill Swift (2–0) || Ike Pearson (1–5) || Curt Davis (1) || 12,941 || 10–23
|- style="background:#fbb"
| 34 || May 26 || @ Dodgers || 4–6 ||  || Lefty Hoerst (0–2) || Kirby Higbe (1) || 5,682 || 10–24
|- style="background:#fbb"
| 35 || May 27 || Dodgers || 0–6 || Hugh Casey (6–2) || Johnny Podgajny (2–2) || None || 1,200 || 10–25
|- style="background:#fbb"
| 36 || May 28 || Dodgers || 5–6 (12) || Bill Swift (3–0) || Roy Bruner (0–3) || None || 10,666 || 10–26
|- style="background:#bfb"
| 37 || May 30 (1) || Braves || 6–5 || Cy Blanton (4–1) || Jim Tobin (2–4) || Bill Crouch (1) || see 2nd game || 11–26
|- style="background:#fbb"
| 38 || May 30 (2) || Braves || 1–4 || Art Johnson (2–1) || Lefty Hoerst (0–3) || None || 12,937 || 11–27
|- style="background:#bfb"
| 39 || May 31 || Braves || 1–0 || Si Johnson (1–1) || Manny Salvo (1–6) || None || 1,500 || 12–27
|-

|- style="background:#fbb"
| 40 || June 1 (1) || Cubs || 5–9 || Charlie Root (3–2) || Ike Pearson (1–6) || Vance Page (1) || see 2nd game || 12–28
|- style="background:#fbb"
| 41 || June 1 (2) || Cubs || 0–1 || Jake Mooty (3–1) || Lee Grissom (0–3) || None || 4,365 || 12–29
|- style="background:#bfb"
| 42 || June 2 || Cubs || 3–2 || Johnny Podgajny (3–2) || Larry French (2–6) || None || 1,000 || 13–29
|- style="background:#bfb"
| 43 || June 3 || Cubs || 7–0 || Tommy Hughes (3–4) || Bill Lee (5–5) || None || 1,000 || 14–29
|- style="background:#bbb"
| – || June 4 || Reds || colspan=6 | Postponed (rain and wet grounds); Makeup: July 19 as a traditional double-header
|- style="background:#bbb"
| – || June 5 || Reds || colspan=6 | Postponed (rain); Makeup: August 18 as a traditional double-header
|- style="background:#fbb"
| 44 || June 6 || Reds || 0–7 ||  || Si Johnson (1–2) || None || 7,044 || 14–30
|- style="background:#bfb"
| 45 || June 7 || Pirates || 2–0 || Cy Blanton (5–1) || Johnny Lanning (1–3) || None || 3,802 || 15–30
|- style="background:#fbb"
| 46 || June 8 (1) || Pirates || 2–12 || Joe Bowman (2–1) || Tommy Hughes (3–5) || Rip Sewell (1) || see 2nd game || 15–31
|- style="background:#bfb"
| 47 || June 8 (2) || Pirates || 5–2 || Johnny Podgajny (4–2) || Russ Bauers (1–3) || None || 11,604 || 16–31
|- style="background:#fbb"
| 48 || June 9 || Pirates || 0–5 || Lefty Wilkie (2–1) || Lee Grissom (0–4) || None || 892 || 16–32
|- style="background:#fbb"
| 49 || June 10 || Cardinals || 0–3 || Lon Warneke (7–1) || Si Johnson (1–3) || None || 3,792 || 16–33
|- style="background:#fbb"
| 50 || June 11 || Cardinals || 2–3 (10) || Howie Krist (5–0) || Boom-Boom Beck (0–3) || None || 6,710 || 16–34
|- style="background:#fbb"
| 51 || June 14 || @ Cubs || 0–3 || Vern Olsen (3–2) || Cy Blanton (5–2) || None || 2,838 || 16–35
|- style="background:#fbb"
| 52 || June 15 (1) || @ Cubs || 0–6 || Claude Passeau (6–5) || Tommy Hughes (3–6) || None || see 2nd game || 16–36
|- style="background:#bfb"
| 53 || June 15 (2) || @ Cubs || 8–4 || Johnny Podgajny (5–2) || Charlie Root (4–3) || None || 7,001 || 17–36
|- style="background:#fbb"
| 54 || June 16 || @ Cubs || 1–3 || Jake Mooty (4–2) || Lee Grissom (0–5) || Tot Pressnell (1) || 3,181 || 17–37
|- style="background:#fbb"
| 55 || June 17 || @ Cardinals || 3–11 || Mort Cooper (7–3) || Boom-Boom Beck (0–4) || None || 1,623 || 17–38
|- style="background:#fbb"
| 56 || June 18 || @ Cardinals || 3–7 || Max Lanier (5–2) || Cy Blanton (5–3) || None || 1,402 || 17–39
|- style="background:#fbb"
| 57 || June 19 || @ Cardinals || 6–7 (11) || Sam Nahem (5–0) || Tommy Hughes (3–7) || None || 1,473 || 17–40
|- style="background:#fbb"
| 58 || June 20 || @ Pirates || 6–7 || Dutch Dietz (1–0) || Ike Pearson (1–7) || None || 1,046 || 17–41
|- style="background:#fbb"
| 59 || June 21 || @ Pirates || 0–2 || Joe Bowman (3–1) || Lee Grissom (0–6) || None || 2,321 || 17–42
|- style="background:#fbb"
| 60 || June 22 (1) || @ Pirates || 1–4 || Rip Sewell (6–6) || Cy Blanton (5–4) || None || see 2nd game || 17–43
|- style="background:#bfb"
| 61 || June 22 (2) || @ Pirates || 7–4 || Tommy Hughes (4–7) || Max Butcher (6–5) || Si Johnson (1) || 10,060 || 18–43
|- style="background:#fbb"
| 62 || June 24 || @ Reds || 1–5 || Bucky Walters (8–6) || Boom-Boom Beck (0–5) || None || 2,184 || 18–44
|- style="background:#fbb"
| 63 || June 25 (1) || @ Reds || 3–8 || Elmer Riddle (7–0) || Johnny Podgajny (5–3) || None || see 2nd game || 18–45
|- style="background:#fbb"
| 64 || June 25 (2) || @ Reds || 1–5 || Monte Pearson (1–2) || Lee Grissom (0–7) || None || 5,071 || 18–46
|- style="background:#fbb"
| 65 || June 27 || @ Giants || 4–7 || Bill Lohrman (4–5) || Si Johnson (1–4) || None || 26,626 || 18–47
|- style="background:#bfb"
| 66 || June 28 || @ Giants || 3–2 (12) || Tommy Hughes (5–7) || Jumbo Brown (1–2) || None || 4,682 || 19–47
|- style="background:#fbb"
| 67 || June 29 || @ Giants || 7–10 || Ace Adams (3–0) || Lee Grissom (0–8) || None || 11,783 || 19–48
|- style="background:#fbb"
| 68 || June 30 || @ Dodgers || 2–9 || Whit Wyatt (12–4) || Johnny Podgajny (5–4) || None || 4,472 || 19–49
|-

|- style="background:#bfb"
| 69 || July 1 || @ Dodgers || 6–4 (10) || Ike Pearson (2–7) || Hugh Casey (9–5) || None || 3,339 || 20–49
|- style="background:#fbb"
| 70 || July 2 || @ Dodgers || 3–9 || Newt Kimball (1–0) || Lefty Hoerst (0–4) || None || 2,799 || 20–50
|- style="background:#fbb"
| 71 || July 3 || @ Braves || 1–4 || Al Javery (5–1) || Tommy Hughes (5–8) || None || 1,003 || 20–51
|- style="background:#fbb"
| 72 || July 4 (1) || @ Braves || 3–4 || Manny Salvo (2–10) || Si Johnson (1–5) || None || see 2nd game || 20–52
|- style="background:#fbb"
| 73 || July 4 (2) || @ Braves || 0–2 || Jim Tobin (4–4) || Johnny Podgajny (5–5) || None || 6,013 || 20–53
|- style="background:#bbb"
| – || July 5 || Giants || colspan=6 | Postponed (wet grounds); Makeup: August 17 as a traditional double-header
|- style="background:#fbb"
| 74 || July 6 (1) || Giants || 3–7 (8) || Carl Hubbell (7–3) || Cy Blanton (5–5) || None || 3,165 || 20–54
|- style="background:#bbb"
| – || July 6 (2) || Giants || colspan=6 | Postponed (wet grounds); Makeup: September 23 as a traditional double-header
|- style="background:#bbcaff;"
| – || July 8 ||colspan="7" | 1941 Major League Baseball All-Star Game at Briggs Stadium in Detroit
|- style="background:#fbb"
| 75 || July 10 || Pirates || 3–6 || Rip Sewell (9–7) || Tommy Hughes (5–9) || Joe Sullivan (1) || 4,630 || 20–55
|- style="background:#fbb"
| 76 || July 12 || Pirates || 1–6 || Johnny Lanning (3–5) || Johnny Podgajny (5–6) || None || 1,500 || 20–56
|- style="background:#fbb"
| 77 || July 13 (1) || Cardinals || 2–7 || Lon Warneke (10–5) || Lefty Hoerst (0–5) || None || see 2nd game || 20–57
|- style="background:#fbb"
| 78 || July 13 (2) || Cardinals || 5–8 || Ira Hutchinson (1–4) || Cy Blanton (5–6) || Bill Crouch (3) || 6,385 || 20–58
|- style="background:#bfb"
| 79 || July 14 || Cardinals || 5–4 || Si Johnson (2–5) || Sam Nahem (5–2) || None || 1,538 || 21–58
|- style="background:#fbb"
| 80 || July 15 || Cardinals || 2–3 (16) || Howie Krist (7–0) || Ike Pearson (2–8) || None || 1,000 || 21–59
|- style="background:#fbb"
| 81 || July 16 || Cubs || 5–9 || Charlie Root (5–5) || Rube Melton (0–1) || Vern Olsen (1) || 5,833 || 21–60
|- style="background:#fffdd0"
| 82 || July 17 || Cubs || 2–2 (6) || None || None || None || 1,500 || 21–60–1
|- style="background:#bbb"
| – || July 19 (1) || Reds || colspan=6 | Postponed (rain); Makeup: August 19 as a traditional double-header
|- style="background:#bbb"
| – || July 19 (2) || Reds || colspan=6 | Postponed (rain); Makeup: August 20 as a traditional double-header
|- style="background:#fbb"
| 83 || July 20 (1) || Reds || 1–7 || Paul Derringer (8–12) || Ike Pearson (2–9) || None || see 2nd game || 21–61–1
|- style="background:#fbb"
| 84 || July 20 (2) || Reds || 2–3 || Jim Turner (3–2) || Lee Grissom (0–9) || Joe Beggs (3) || 7,582 || 21–62–1
|- style="background:#fbb"
| 85 || July 22 || @ Pirates || 3–4 || Bob Klinger (3–3) || Johnny Podgajny (5–7) || None || 1,730 || 21–63–1
|- style="background:#fbb"
| 86 || July 23 || @ Pirates || 2–5 || Max Butcher (10–7) || Cy Blanton (5–7) || None || 13,109 || 21–64–1
|- style="background:#fbb"
| 87 || July 24 || @ Pirates || 2–3 || Bob Klinger (4–3) || Lee Grissom (0–10) || None || 1,326 || 21–65–1
|- style="background:#bfb"
| 88 || July 25 || @ Reds || 4–3 || Tommy Hughes (6–9) ||  || None || 2,044 || 22–65–1
|- style="background:#fbb"
| 89 || July 26 || @ Reds || 2–6 || Jim Turner (4–2) || Si Johnson (2–6) || None || 3,181 || 22–66–1
|- style="background:#fbb"
| 90 || July 27 (1) || @ Reds || 0–2 || Paul Derringer (9–12) || Boom-Boom Beck (0–6) || None || see 2nd game || 22–67–1
|- style="background:#bfb"
| 91 || July 27 (2) || @ Reds || 8–1 || Johnny Podgajny (6–7) || Bucky Walters (12–8) || None || 13,463 || 23–67–1
|- style="background:#fbb"
| 92 || July 29 || @ Cubs || 4–12 || Larry French (5–11) || Ike Pearson (2–10) || None || 2,440 || 23–68–1
|- style="background:#bfb"
| 93 || July 30 (1) || @ Cubs || 8–4 || Cy Blanton (6–7) || Jake Mooty (3–4) || None || see 2nd game || 24–68–1
|- style="background:#fbb"
| 94 || July 30 (2) || @ Cubs || 3–5 || Tot Pressnell (2–2) || Ike Pearson (2–11) || None || 7,499 || 24–69–1
|- style="background:#bfb"
| 95 || July 31 || @ Cubs || 7–2 || Johnny Podgajny (7–7) || Charlie Root (5–6) || None || 2,203 || 25–29–1
|-

|- style="background:#bfb"
| 96 || August 1 || @ Cardinals || 2–1 (11) || Si Johnson (3–6) || Lon Warneke (12–6) || None || 20,342 || 
|- style="background:#fbb"
| 97 || August 2 || @ Cardinals || 7–11 || Howie Krist (9–0) || Lee Grissom (0–11) || None || 2,251 || 26–70–1
|- style="background:#fbb"
| 98 || August 3 (1) || @ Cardinals || 1–6 || Mort Cooper (8–3) || Cy Blanton (6–8) || None || see 2nd game || 26–71–1
|- style="background:#fbb"
| 99 || August 3 (2) || @ Cardinals || 1–6 || Lon Warneke (13–6) || Ike Pearson (2–12) || None || 11,280 || 26–72–1
|- style="background:#fbb"
| 100 || August 5 || Braves || 9–10 || Hank LaManna (5–3) || Tommy Hughes (6–10) || Tom Earley (3) || 1,000 || 26–73–1
|- style="background:#fbb"
| 101 || August 6 || Braves || 0–6 || Manny Salvo (3–11) || Si Johnson (3–7) || None || 3,223 || 26–74–1
|- style="background:#fbb"
| 102 || August 8 || @ Giants || 2–3 (11) || Bill Lohrman (7–7) || Cy Blanton (6–9) || None || 2,388 || 26–75–1
|- style="background:#fbb"
| 103 || August 9 || @ Giants || 0–1 || Hal Schumacher (7–8) || Johnny Podgajny (7–8) || None || 2,922 || 26–76–1
|- style="background:#fbb"
| 104 || August 10 (1) || @ Giants || 4–5 || Ace Adams (4–1) || Tommy Hughes (6–11) || Cliff Melton (1) || see 2nd game || 26–77–1
|- style="background:#bfb"
| 105 || August 10 (2) || @ Giants || 4–3 || Si Johnson (4–7) || Johnny Wittig (2–5) || None || 9,877 || 27–77–1
|- style="background:#bfb"
| 106 || August 11 || @ Braves || 6–3 || Boom-Boom Beck (1–6) || Hank LaManna (5–4) || None || 1,043 || 28–77–1
|- style="background:#bfb"
| 107 || August 12 || @ Braves || 2–1 (13) || Ike Pearson (3–12) || Jim Tobin (9–7) || None || 1,173 || 29–77–1
|- style="background:#fbb"
| 108 || August 13 || @ Dodgers || 2–7 || Curt Davis (8–6) || Johnny Podgajny (7–9) || None || 16,991 || 29–78–1
|- style="background:#bbb"
| – || August 15 || Giants || colspan=6 | Postponed (rain); Makeup: September 24 as a traditional double-header
|- style="background:#fbb"
| 109 || August 16 || Giants || 1–4 || Johnny Wittig (3–5) || Tommy Hughes (6–12) || Jumbo Brown (8) || 7,000 || 29–79–1
|- style="background:#bfb"
| 110 || August 17 (1) || Giants || 6–2 || Si Johnson (5–7) || Bob Carpenter (7–5) || None || see 2nd game || 30–79–1
|- style="background:#bfb"
| 111 || August 17 (2) || Giants || 18–2 || Lee Grissom (1–11) || Bill Lohrman (8–8) || None || 6,587 || 31–79–1
|- style="background:#fbb"
| 112 || August 18 (1) || Reds || 5–13 || Joe Beggs (3–1) ||  || None || see 2nd game || 31–80–1
|- style="background:#fbb"
| 113 || August 18 (2) || Reds || 4–5 || Gene Thompson (3–4) || Johnny Podgajny (7–10) || None || 2,873 || 31–81–1
|- style="background:#bbb"
| – || August 19 (1) || Reds || colspan=6 | Postponed (rain and wet grounds); Makeup: September 17 as a traditional double-header in Cincinnati
|- style="background:#bbb"
| – || August 19 (2) || Reds || colspan=6 | Postponed (rain and wet grounds); Makeup: September 18 as a traditional double-header in Cincinnati
|- style="background:#fbb"
| 114 || August 20 (1) || Reds || 0–2 ||  || Lefty Hoerst (0–6) || None || see 2nd game || 31–82–1
|- style="background:#fbb"
| 115 || August 20 (2) || Reds || 0–3 || Elmer Riddle (14–2) || Rube Melton (0–2) || None || 8,605 || 31–83–1
|- style="background:#bfb"
| 116 || August 21 || Cardinals || 5–4 || Ike Pearson (4–12) || Mort Cooper (11–5) || None || 7,209 || 32–83–1
|- style="background:#fbb"
| 117 || August 22 || Cardinals || 2–4 (10) || Lon Warneke (14–7) || Cy Blanton (6–10) || None || 1,000 || 32–84–1
|- style="background:#bfb"
| 118 || August 23 || Cardinals || 4–2 || Lee Grissom (2–11) || Bill Crouch (2–5) || Si Johnson (2) || 2,607 || 33–84–1
|- style="background:#bfb"
| 119 || August 24 (1) || Cubs || 8–5 || Johnny Podgajny (8–10) || Vallie Eaves (2–2) || Ike Pearson (2) || see 2nd game || 34–84–1
|- style="background:#bfb"
| 120 || August 24 (2) || Cubs || 7–6 || Lefty Hoerst (1–6) || Claude Passeau (12–11) || None || 8,145 || 35–84–1
|- style="background:#fbb"
| 121 || August 26 (1) || Cubs || 4–5 || Jake Mooty (7–5) || Lefty Hoerst (1–7) || None || see 2nd game || 35–85–1
|- style="background:#fbb"
| 122 || August 26 (2) || Cubs || 3–11 || Paul Erickson (2–5) || Si Johnson (5–8) || None || 3,500 || 35–86–1
|- style="background:#fbb"
| 123 || August 27 || Pirates || 2–12 || Johnny Lanning (9–8) || Cy Blanton (6–11) || None || 1,748 || 35–87–1
|- style="background:#fbb"
| 124 || August 28 || Pirates || 2–3 || Dutch Dietz (5–1) || Ike Pearson (4–13) || Bob Klinger (4) || 5,500 || 35–88–1
|- style="background:#fbb"
| 125 ||  || Braves || 3–8 || Jim Tobin (12–8) || Lee Grissom (2–12) || None || see 2nd game || 35–89–1
|- style="background:#bfb"
| 126 || August 31 (2) || Braves || 8–5 || Johnny Podgajny (9–10) || Manny Salvo (5–13) || Ike Pearson (3) || 5,661 || 36–89–1
|-

|- style="background:#fbb"
| 127 || September 1 (1) || @ Giants || 2–7 || Bob Carpenter (8–6) || Tommy Hughes (6–13) || None || see 2nd game || 36–90–1
|- style="background:#fbb"
| 128 || September 1 (2) || @ Giants || 3–4 (10) || Bob Bowman (6–6) || Boom-Boom Beck (1–8) || None || 8,248 || 36–91–1
|- style="background:#fbb"
| 129 || September 3 (1) || Dodgers || 1–4 || Whit Wyatt (19–9) || Lee Grissom (2–13) || None || see 2nd game || 36–92–1
|- style="background:#bfb"
| 130 || September 3 (2) || Dodgers || 4–1 || Lefty Hoerst (2–7) || Ed Albosta (0–1) || None || 7,260 || 37–92–1
|- style="background:#bbb"
| – || September 4 || Dodgers || colspan=6 | Postponed (rain); Makeup: September 21 as a traditional double-header
|- style="background:#bfb"
| 131 || September 6 || @ Braves || 4–3 || Rube Melton (1–2) || Jim Tobin (12–9) || Ike Pearson (4) || 1,868 || 38–92–1
|- style="background:#fbb"
| 132 || September 7 (1) || @ Braves || 6–17 || Manny Salvo (6–14) || Cy Blanton (6–12) || None || see 2nd game || 38–93–1
|- style="background:#fbb"
| 133 || September 7 (2) || @ Braves || 1–10 || Tom Earley (5–5) || Lefty Hoerst (2–8) || None || 7,161 || 38–94–1
|- style="background:#bbb"
| – || September 9 || @ Cardinals || colspan=6 | Postponed (rain); Makeup: September 10 as a traditional double-header
|- style="background:#fbb"
| 134 || September 10 (1) || @ Cardinals || 2–3 || Lon Warneke (16–8) || Ike Pearson (4–14) || Bill Crouch (7) || see 2nd game || 38–95–1
|- style="background:#fbb"
| 135 || September 10 (2) || @ Cardinals || 0–1 || Harry Gumbert (10–6) || Si Johnson (5–9) || None || 3,250 || 38–96–1
|- style="background:#bfb"
| 136 || September 12 || @ Cubs || 5–3 || Tommy Hughes (7–13) || Jake Mooty (7–8) || None || 2,023 || 39–96–1
|- style="background:#fbb"
| 137 || September 13 || @ Cubs || 4–5 (11) || Claude Passeau (14–13) || Johnny Podgajny (9–11) || None || 3,771 || 39–97–1
|- style="background:#fbb"
| 138 ||  || @ Pirates || 1–2 || Max Butcher (16–11) || Lefty Hoerst (2–9) || None || see 2nd game || 39–98–1
|- style="background:#bfb"
| 139 || September 14 (2) || @ Pirates || 6–3 || Tommy Hughes (8–13) || Rip Sewell (13–16) || None || 7,495 || 40–98–1
|- style="background:#fbb"
| 140 || September 17 (1) || @ Reds || 0–1 ||  || Rube Melton (1–3) || None || see 2nd game || 40–99–1
|- style="background:#fbb"
| 141 || September 17 (2) || @ Reds || 2–3 || Gene Thompson (6–6) ||  || None || 2,199 || 
|- style="background:#fbb"
| 142 || September 18 (1) || @ Reds || 0–5 || Ray Starr (2–2) || Tommy Hughes (8–14) || None || see 2nd game || 40–101–1
|- style="background:#fbb"
| 143 || September 18 (2) || @ Reds || 2–9 || Jim Turner (6–4) || Si Johnson (5–10) || None || 2,465 || 40–102–1
|- style="background:#fbb"
| 144 || September 20 (1) || Dodgers || 2–3 || Whit Wyatt (21–10) || Lefty Hoerst (2–10) || Hugh Casey (6) || see 2nd game || 40–103–1
|- style="background:#fbb"
| 145 || September 20 (2) || Dodgers || 1–6 || Kirby Higbe (21–9) || Cy Blanton (6–13) || None || 17,794 || 40–104–1
|- style="background:#fbb"
| 146 || September 21 (1) || Dodgers || 3–8 || Johnny Allen (5–5) || Johnny Podgajny (9–12) || None || see 2nd game || 40–105–1
|- style="background:#bfb"
| 147 || September 21 (2) || Dodgers || 6–3 || Tommy Hughes (9–14) || Luke Hamlin (8–8) || Ike Pearson (5) || 35,909 || 41–105–1
|- style="background:#fbb"
| 148 || September 22 || Dodgers || 0–5 || Curt Davis (13–7) || Rube Melton (1–4) || None || 8,434 || 41–106–1
|- style="background:#bfb"
| 149 || September 23 (1) || Giants || 8–2 || Paul Masterson (1–0) || Cliff Melton (8–11) || None || see 2nd game || 42–106–1
|- style="background:#fbb"
| 150 || September 23 (2) || Giants || 6–8 || Hugh East (1–1) || Dale Jones (0–1) || Ace Adams (1) || 1,000 || 42–107–1
|- style="background:#fbb"
| 151 || September 24 (1) || Giants || 1–4 || Hal Schumacher (12–10) || Si Johnson (5–11) || None || see 2nd game || 42–108–1
|- style="background:#fbb"
| 152 || September 24 (2) || Giants || 0–2 || Tom Sunkel (1–1) || Gene Lambert (0–1) || None || 2,000 || 42–109–1
|- style="background:#fbb"
| 153 || September 25 || Giants || 2–3 || Bob Carpenter (11–6) || Si Johnson (5–12) || None || 500 || 42–110–1
|- style="background:#bfb"
| 154 || September 27 || @ Dodgers || 7–3 || Lefty Hoerst (3–10) || Ed Albosta (0–2) || Ike Pearson (6) || 11,806 || 43–110–1
|- style="background:#fbb"
| 155 || September 28 || @ Dodgers || 1–5 || Bob Chipman (1–0) || Rube Melton (1–5) || None || 12,870 || 43–111–1
|-

| style="text-align:left;" |
The original schedule indicated single games on June 22 and September 14, 15, and 16 at Pittsburgh; which became double-headers on June 22 and September 14.
The July 17, 1941, game ended after six innings due to rain with the score tied 2–2, and an additional game was scheduled for August 25.
The original schedule indicated single games on July 30 and September 11 at Chicago; which became a double-header on July 30.
The original schedule indicated single games on August 10 and September 2 at New York; which became a double-header on August 10.
The original schedule indicated single games on August 24, 25, and 26 with Chicago. An additional game was scheduled for August 25 because of the tie game on July 17. The end result was double-headers played on August 24 and 26.
The original schedule indicated single games on August 30 and 31 with Boston; which became a double-header on August 31.
The original schedule indicated single games on September 5 and 7 at Boston; which became a double-header on September 7.

Roster

Player stats

Batting

Starters by position 
Note: Pos = Position; G = Games played; AB = At bats; H = Hits; Avg. = Batting average; HR = Home runs; RBI = Runs batted in

Other batters 
Note: G = Games played; AB = At bats; H = Hits; Avg. = Batting average; HR = Home runs; RBI = Runs batted in

Pitching

Starting pitchers 
Note: G = Games pitched; IP = Innings pitched; W = Wins; L = Losses; ERA = Earned run average; SO = Strikeouts

Other pitchers 
Note: G = Games pitched; IP = Innings pitched; W = Wins; L = Losses; ERA = Earned run average; SO = Strikeouts

Relief pitchers 
Note: G = Games pitched; W = Wins; L = Losses; SV = Saves; ERA = Earned run average; SO = Strikeouts

Farm system

Notes

References 
1941 Philadelphia Phillies season at Baseball Reference

Philadelphia Phillies seasons
Philadelphia Phillies season
Philadelphia